Atlas Atlantique Airlines, formerly Atlantique Air Assistance, was a French regional airline headquartered in La Chevrolière. The airline's base was at Nantes Atlantique Airport with an office at Paris - Le Bourget Airport.

History

The airline was created in 1989 as Atlantique Air Assistance that operates charter flights, corporate aviation, Air ambulance, non-emergency medical transportation services and freight transport flights in France and Europe, mostly on  behalf of other larger French companies. The company holds a Global Operating License, as well as an Air Transport certification (CTA N°F-O-002) granted by the French Civil aviation authority. The company is also ISO 9001-2000 certified.

In 2006, it created a subsidiary called "Atlantique Air Lines" to offer their customers bigger aircraft over 19 seats, with two Embraer EMB 120 Brasilia (30 passengers). In 2008 Atlantique Air Lines replaced one of its Brasilias with a larger ATR 42 (46 passengers). It is the last French airline to operate the small Brazilian prop aircraft. In December 2015 the company came back as Atlas Atlantique Airlines by operating charter flights between France and Algeria.

In 2015, Atlas Air Assistance was acquired by the Atlas Tour group and renamed Atlas Atlantic Airlines. As of 17 December 2015, the company was developing its activity on medium-haul flights between France and Algeria. It was using an Airbus A320 chartered by the Lithuanian company Small Planet Airlines. In 2017, the company also chartered an Airbus A319-100, leased from the Greek company Olympus Airways.

In 2017, the company was experiencing serious financial difficulties, having difficulty stabilizing its model. As a result of payment problems, Atlas Atlantique Airlines was placed in receivership. It ceased operations in October 2017, losing its operating license and Air operator's certificate (AOC) on 13 November 2017. Due to the lack of buyers, the airline was placed in bankruptcy on 6 December 2017 and will never restart operations.

Fleet
As of January 2015 the Atlas Atlantique Airlines fleet included the following aircraft:

1 Airbus A320-200
2 ATR 42-320
1 Beechcraft King Air 90

References

External links

 

Defunct airlines of France
Airlines established in 1989
Airlines disestablished in 2017
French companies established in 1989
French companies disestablished in 2017